NGC 677 is an elliptical galaxy located in the constellation Aries. It was discovered on September 25, 1886, by the astronomer Lewis A. Swift. It is located about 200 million light-years (70 megaparsecs) from Earth at the center of a rich galaxy cluster. It has a LINER nucleus.

References

See also 
 List of NGC objects (1–1000)

Elliptical galaxies
Aries (constellation)
0677
006673